Nineteen Ninety Five and Nowhere is the second solo studio album by the British guitarist Gary Marx.

Track listing

Personnel 

Gary Marx - Vocals, all instruments & drum programming

External links
 Official D-Monic page
 Official Gary Marx page

2008 albums